The 1996–97 season, was the Guildford Flames' fifth year of ice hockey. Despite the fact the Guildford Flames advised with the setting up of the new top league in British Ice Hockey - the Ice Hockey Superleague, they opted to become members of the lower British National League. The unsettled Flames suffered from the loss of both their general manager and managing director and the five-year-old club, under coach Wayne Crawford, struggled through the campaign with a turnover of 41 players.

The Guildford Flames game against the Solihull Blaze on Saturday 8 March 1997 was abandoned at 14.25 when the plexi-glass broke irreparably when Mark Finney of the Flames and Blaze defenceman Steve Carpenter collided in the corner in an off-the-puck incident. Play was stopped and rink staff were called to the scene. Unfortunately, after over an hour of repair work, the engineers and the match referee - Jamie Craiper, concluded that the boards were not in a fit state for the game to be resumed safely, and the match was abandoned. Guildford who were leading 3-0 at the time were rewarded the 3-0 victory. Solihull went bust just two days later with debts in excess of a quarter-of-a-million pounds.

The Guildford Flames had their own hour long radio show on County Sound Radio 1476am, every Saturday throughout the season, running from 12-1pm. It was hosted by Peter Gordon and Ryan Campbell.

Player statistics

Netminders

Schedule And Results

Pre-Season

Benson & Hedges Cup

Regular season

Postseason

Other Guildford Ice Hockey Teams - 1996/1997 Season

References

External links 
 Official Guildford Flames website

Guildford Flames seasons
1996–97 in English ice hockey